Hermansky–Pudlak syndrome 6 (HPS6), also known as ruby-eye protein homolog (Ru), is a protein that in humans is encoded by the HPS6 gene.

Function 
This intronless gene encodes a protein that may play a role in organelle biogenesis associated with melanosomes, platelet dense granules, and lysosomes. HPS6 along with HPS3 and HPS5 form a stable protein complex named Biogenesis of Lysosome-related Organelles Complex-2 (BLOC-2).

Clinical significance 

Mutations in this gene are associated with Hermansky–Pudlak syndrome type 6  characterized by albinism and prolonged bleeding.

References

Further reading

External links
  GeneReviews/NCBI/NIH/UW entry on Hermansky–Pudlak syndrome